Viktoria (born Teresita Viktoria Elizaga Agbayani on July 28, 1969) is a Filipina singer.

Early life
From the political clan of the Agbayani of Pangasinan, Viktoria started her singing career at age 17. While pursuing her singing career, she managed to finish a Mass communications degree at the University of the Philippines. She is the youngest daughter of Former Governor Aguedo F. Agbayani of Pangasinan.

Discography
Viktoria first recognition in the Philippines with her music video "Sasabihin Ko Na". Her initial release was soon followed by two other music videos "Dahan Dahan” and "Tender Kisses". Her albums spawned singles such as "Dahan Dahan", "Sana", "Pwede Ba", and "To Be Near You", the single from the Soundtrack of the Hollywood TV series "Felicity".

Studio albums
Viktoria (1992; OctoArts International, Inc.)
Viktorious Viktoria (1995; OctoArts-EMI Music, Inc.)
Secrets (1999; Sony Music Entertainment Philippines)
Here To Stay (2005; Warner Music Philippines)
Vixen (2016; FlipMusic Records)
AWARDS

MTV AWARDS PHILIPPINES 2000- Best Female Music Video

13TH AWIT AWARDS- Best Dance Recording (as producer, songwriter and singer) "Puede Ba"

13TH AWIT AWARDS - Music Video of the Year "Puede Ba"

13TH AWIT AWARDS - Best Performance in a Video "Puede Ba"

13TH AWIT AWARDS - Best Producer "Puede Ba"

KATHA MUSIC AWARDS 2000- Record of the Year

R.X. 93.1 AWARDS 2000- Female OPM Artist of the Year

Gold medalist 23rd SEA Games (sport Muay Thai )

Best Music Video Shockfest Film Festival 2012, Hollywood

Best International Music Video Pollygrind Film Festival 2012, Las Vegas

Nominated Best Soundtrack AOF International Music Festival 2012, Pasadena, California

Nominated Best Music Video AOF International Music Festival 2012, Pasadena, California

Singles
Addicted
Are You Ready For Love
Bongga
Dahan-Dahan
Dance With Me
Dangerous
Dedma
Goodbye
Hmmm Teka
I Do
If You Were Mine
Ilipad Mo Ako
Mahal Pa Rin Kita
Nang Makita Ka
Paano
Padaplis
Puede Ba?
Sana
Sasabihin Ko Na
Sexy Boy
Shubidu
Tender Kisses
To Be Near You
Vixen
What If
Working Students

Awards

References

Living people
21st-century Filipino women singers
Singers from Pangasinan
1969 births
20th-century Filipino women singers